KTRX (92.7 FM) is a radio station in Dickson, Oklahoma, serving the Lake Texoma region with an adult top 40 format. The station is owned by Stephens Media Group.

History
The station signed on in June 2001 with a classic rock format. By May 17, 2022, KTRX had evolved to an active rock format; at 12p.m. that day, the station began stunting with song excerpts featuring the word "star" ahead of an announcement to be made at 6a.m. on May 18. At that time, the station flipped to an adult top 40 format as "Star 92.7", with the first song being "Counting Stars" by OneRepublic.

References

External links

TRX
Radio stations established in 2001
2001 establishments in Oklahoma
Adult top 40 radio stations in the United States